Oreste Puliti (18 February 1891 – 5 February 1958) was an Italian fencer. He won four gold medals and a silver at three Olympic Games.

His teammates were accused of attempting to inflate his score by losing to him in the final of the Men's Sabre in 1924. He was disqualified for threatening to assault a Hungarian judge, Gyorgy Kovacs.

References

1891 births
1958 deaths
Italian male fencers
Olympic fencers of Italy
Fencers at the 1920 Summer Olympics
Fencers at the 1924 Summer Olympics
Fencers at the 1928 Summer Olympics
Olympic gold medalists for Italy
Olympic silver medalists for Italy
Olympic medalists in fencing
Sportspeople from Livorno
Medalists at the 1920 Summer Olympics
Medalists at the 1924 Summer Olympics
Medalists at the 1928 Summer Olympics